Cryptoscenea is a genus of lacewings belonging to the family Coniopterygidae.

The species of this genus are found in Australia and New Zealand.

Species

Species:

Cryptoscenea antennalis 
Cryptoscenea australiensis 
Cryptoscenea diversicornis 
Cryptoscenea evansorum Smithers, 1984 
Cryptoscenea hoelzeli Sziráki, 1997 
Cryptoscenea maior Sziráki & Winterton, 2012
Cryptoscenea novaeguineensis Meinander, 1972
Cryptoscenea obscurior Meinander, 1972
Cryptoscenea ohmi Sziráki, 1997
Cryptoscenea orientalis C.K. Yang & Z.Q. Liu, 1993
Cryptoscenea serrata Meinander, 1979
Cryptoscenea stylaris Sziráki & van Harten, 2006
Cryptoscenea tanzaniae Meinander, 1998

References

Coniopterygidae
Neuroptera genera